Holt Township is the name of some places in the U.S. state of Minnesota:
Holt Township, Fillmore County, Minnesota
Holt Township, Marshall County, Minnesota

See also
Holt Township (disambiguation)

Minnesota township disambiguation pages